was a Japanese sumo wrestler from Kōfu, Yamanashi. He was the first sumo wrestler to die from COVID-19, and is also thought to be the first person in their 20s to die from the virus in Japan.

Career
Shobushi did judo at Ryuo Junior High School in Kai. He joined Takadagawa stable in 2007. His highest rank was sandanme 11, which he achieved in November 2017. His partner in the performances was Takamisato of the Azumazeki stable. Following Takamisato's retirement in 2018 Shobushi's partner was Ebisumaru, who made his professional debut alongside Shobushi and is also from Takadagawa. Shobushi also performed at Takekaze's  in February 2020.

Illness and death
Shobushi was the first sumo wrestler confirmed to have been infected with the COVID-19 during the COVID-19 pandemic in Japan, though his identity was not disclosed at the time. On April 4, 2020, he developed a fever, but was not able to get medical attention or get admitted to a hospital until April 8 when coughing up blood, due to the high number of people with symptoms that Japan was experiencing at the time. An initial test for coronavirus came back negative, but after being transferred to a different hospital he tested positive on April 10. He remained in intensive care from 19 April until his death from multiple organ failure brought on by COVID-19 related pneumonia on May 13. Prior to his death, he suffered from diabetes and in 2016 had to withdraw from a bout because of hypoglycemia. He was the first active sumo wrestler to die since Wakamiume of  the makushita division died of acute myelogenous leukemia in 2008. Shortly before the announcement of his death, the May tournament was cancelled.

The Nishonoseki ichimon (a group of related  stables) was planning to hold a ichimon funeral for Shobushi, which are normally reserved for wrestlers who go on to be elders of the Japan Sumo Association (JSA). The JSA chairman, Hakkaku, said after Shobushi's death, "We cannot find any words to say when we think about the broken hearts of his family. It must have been so very painful to fight the disease for over a month but, like a sumo wrestler, he persevered and endured, fighting to the very end. We only wish that he rests in peace now."

Fighting style
Shobushi was an oshi-sumo specialist who preferred pushing and thrusting rather than fighting on the mawashi. His most common winning kimarite or techniques were oshi-dashi (push out) and tsuki-otoshi (thrust over).

Career record

See also
 List of past sumo wrestlers
 Glossary of sumo terms

References

External links
 Profile at Takadagawa stable
 Shobushi and Ebisumaru's shokkiri performance. February 1, 2020 (Japan Sumo Association Official channel)

1991 births
2020 deaths
Japanese sumo wrestlers
Sumo wrestlers who died while active
Sumo people from Yamanashi Prefecture
Deaths from the COVID-19 pandemic in Japan